Anti-American sentiment in Afghanistan has been encouraged by the Quran burning incident and the leaking online of a video of US troops urinating on Taliban fighters.  Drone strikes have also led to growing anti-Americanism in and beyond Afghanistan.

After the Fall of Kabul in 2021, Taliban parade 'mock funerals' coffins draped in UK and US flags for NATO powers, as they celebrate 'independence day'. Badri 313 Battalion released an image mocking the famed photo of US soldiers raising the American flag on Iwo Jima.

See also
 Parwan Detention Facility at Bagram Airfield
 Anti-American sentiment in Pakistan
 Haditha killings
 How the World Sees America
 Maywand District killings

Notes

Afghanistan–United States relations
Afghanistan
Politics of Afghanistan